Mahdi Wissam Zein (born 23 May 2000) is a Lebanese footballer who plays as a midfielder for  club Nejmeh and the Lebanon national team.

Club career
On 29 April 2019, Nejmeh renewed the contract of Zein for five years, renewable for two additional seasons. On 2 April 2021, Zein scored his first senior goal against Shabab Sahel, helping his side win 3–0 in the league.

International career

Zein represented Lebanon at under-16, under-19 and under-23 levels. His senior debut came on 4 December 2021, as a substitute in a 2–0 defeat to Algeria in the 2021 FIFA Arab Cup.

Style of play 
Regarded as one of Lebanon's most promising players, Zein is a playmaking midfielder, capable of moving play from the defence to the attack. His main abilities are his through passes and ball control.

Personal life
Mahdi Zein's uncle, Haitham Zein, is a former Lebanese international.

Career statistics

International

Honours
Nejmeh
 Lebanese FA Cup: 2021–22; runner-up: 2020–21
 Lebanese Elite Cup: 2021
 Lebanese Super Cup runner-up: 2021

See also
 List of association football families

References

External links

 
 
 
 

2000 births
Living people
People from Tyre District
Lebanese footballers
Association football midfielders
Nejmeh SC players
Lebanese Premier League players
Lebanon youth international footballers
Lebanon international footballers